Cornelia de Lange syndrome (CdLS) is a genetic disorder. People with this syndrome experience a range of physical, cognitive, and medical challenges ranging from mild to severe. The syndrome has a widely varied phenotype, meaning people with the syndrome have varied features and challenges. The typical features of CdLS include thick or long eyebrows, a small nose, small stature, developmental delay, long or smooth philtrum, thin upper lip and downturned mouth.

The syndrome is named after Dutch pediatrician Cornelia Catharina de Lange, who described it in 1933.

It is often termed Brachmann de Lange syndrome or Bushy syndrome and is also known as Amsterdam dwarfism. Its exact incidence is unknown, but it is estimated at 1 in 10,000 to 30,000.

Signs and symptoms

The phenotype of CdLS is highly varied and is described as a spectrum; from Classic CdLS (with a greater number of key features) to mild variations with only a few features. Some people will have a small number of features but don't have CdLS.

Key features:
 Long and/or thick eyebrows
 Short nose
 Concave nasal ridge  and/or upturned nasal tip
 Long and/or smooth philtrum
 Thin upper lip vermilion and/or downturned corners of mouth
 Missing fingers or toes
 Congenital diaphragmatic hernia

Other suggestive features:
 Developmental delay or intellectual disability
 Small prenatal and birth size or weight
 Small stature
 Microcephaly (prenatally or postnatally)
 Small hands or feet
 Short fifth finger
 Hirsutism

The following health conditions are more common in people with CdLS than in the general population.
 Respiratory illness
 Heart defects (e.g., pulmonary stenosis, VSD, ASD, coarctation of the aorta)
 Hearing impairment
 Vision abnormalities (e.g., ptosis, nystagmus, high myopia, hypertropia)
 Partial joining of the second and third toes
 Incurved 5th fingers (clinodactyly)
 Gastroesophageal reflux
 Gastrointestinal abnormalities
 Musculoskeletal problems
 Scoliosis
 Social anxiety
 Seizures
 Cleft palate
 Feeding problems

Children with this syndrome are often found to have long eyelashes, bushy eyebrows and synophrys (joined eyebrows). Body hair can be excessive and affected individuals are often shorter than their immediate family members. They present a characteristic facial phenotype.

Children with CdLS often have gastrointestinal tract difficulties, particularly gastroesophageal reflux. Vomiting, intermittent poor appetite, constipation, diarrhea or gaseous distention are known to be a regularity in cases where the GI tract problems are acute. Symptoms may range from mild to severe.

People with CdLS may exhibit behaviours that have been described as "autistic-like," including self-stimulation, aggression, self-injury or strong preference to a structured routine. Behavior problems in CdLS are not inevitable. Many behaviour issues associated with CdLS are reactive (i.e., something happens within the person's body or environment to bring on the behavior) and cyclical (comes and goes). Often, an underlying medical issue, pain, social anxiety, environmental or caregiver stress can be associated with a change behaviour. If pain or a medical issue is the cause, once treated, the behaviour diminishes.

There is evidence for some features of premature aging including the early development of Barrett's esophagus, osteoporosis present in the teenage years, premature greying of hair and some changes to the skin of the face causing a more aged appearance compared to chronological age.

Causes
The vast majority of cases are thought to be due to spontaneous genetic mutations. It can be associated with mutations affecting the cohesin complex.

As of 2018, it was confirmed that 500 genetic mutations have been associated with the condition; occurring on 7 different genes.  In around 30% of cases of CdLS the genetic cause remains undiscovered. The wide variation in phenotype is attributed to a high degree of somatic mosaicism in CdLS as well as the different genes and type of mutations. For this reason people with CdLS can have very different appearance,  abilities,  and associated health issues.

The latter two genes seem to correlate with a milder form of the syndrome.

In 2004, researchers at the Children's Hospital of Philadelphia (United States) and the University of Newcastle upon Tyne (England) identified a gene (NIPBL) on chromosome 5 that causes CdLS when it is mutated. Since then, additional genes have been found (SMC1A, SMC3 and HDAC8, RAD21) that cause CdLS when changed. In July 2012, the fourth "CdLS gene"—HDAC8—was announced.  HDAC8 is an X-linked gene, meaning it is located on the X chromosome. Individuals with CdLS who have the gene change in HDAC8 make up just a small portion of all people with CdLS. Evidence of a linkage at chromosome 3q26.3 is mixed.

Genetic alterations associated with CdLS have been identified in genes NIPBL, SMC1A and SMC3 as well as the more recently identified genes RAD21 and HDAC8.  All of these genetic alterations occurring in CdLS patients affect proteins that function in the cohesin pathway.  SMC1A, SMC3 and RAD21 proteins are structural components of the cohesin ring complex. NIPBL is involved in the loading of the cohesin ring onto chromosomes, and HDAC8 deacylates SMC3 to facilitate its function.  The cohesin pathway is involved in cohesion of sister chromatids during mitosis, DNA repair, chromosome segregation and the regulation of developmental gene expression. Defects in these functions are theorised to underlie some of the features of CdLS. In particular, defective DNA repair may underlie the features of premature aging.

Diagnosis
The diagnosis of CdLS is primarily based on clinical findings by a clinical geneticist; and in some cases may be confirmed through laboratory testing.

Treatment
Often, an interdisciplinary approach is recommended to treat the issues associated with CdLS. A team for promoting the child's well-being often includes speech, occupational and physical therapists, teachers, physicians, and parents.

Cornelia de Lange syndrome (CdLS) affects many different systems of the body, medical management is often provided by a team of doctors and other healthcare professionals. Treatment for this condition varies based on the signs and symptoms present in each person. It may include: [4] [5]

Supplemental formulas and/or gastrostomy tube placement to meet nutritional needs and improve the growth delay,
Ongoing physical, occupational, and speech therapies,
Surgery to treat skeletal abnormalities, gastrointestinal problems, congenital heart defects and other health problems, and,
Medications to prevent or control seizures.

Research into CdLS ongoing

History
The first documented case was in 1916 by Winfried Robert Clemens Brachmann (1888–1969), a German physician who wrote about the distinct features of the disease from his 19-year-old patient, followed in 1933 by Cornelia Catharina de Lange (1871–1950), a Dutch pediatrician after whom the disorder has been named. CdLS was formerly known as Brachmann-de Lange Syndrome.

References

External links 

  GeneReviews/NCBI/UW/NIH entry on Cornelia de Lange syndrome
 

Nucleus diseases
Syndromes affecting stature
Rare syndromes
Syndromes with craniofacial abnormalities
Syndromes with cleft lip and/or palate